Alan Bell was an English cricketer who played for Hertfordshire.

Bell, who represented Hertfordshire in the Minor Counties Championship between 1957 and 1967, made a single List A appearance for the side, in the 1966 Gillette Cup.

Bell scored 105 runs from the opening order in the only innings in which he batted in List A cricket - though this century was not enough to save the team from defeat in the competition.

External links
Alan Bell at Cricket Archive 

English cricketers
Hertfordshire cricketers
Living people
Year of birth missing (living people)
Place of birth missing (living people)